Jonathan Richard Kirkpatrick (born February 1958) was Dean of Dunedin from 1996 until 2001.

He obtained an honours degree in theology from the University of London. He came to New Zealand in 1991 with his partner, Tim Barnett, to be vicar at St Michael and All Angels, Christchurch.  Kirkpatrick is known for his gay-rights activism within the Anglican church.

Kirkpatrick became Dean of St Paul's Cathedral in Dunedin in 1996.  Barnett remained in Christchurch and was elected to parliament later that year as the Labour MP for Christchurch Central. Kirkpatrick obtained a Master of Business Administration degree in commerce at the University of Otago. In August 1998, Barnett fell asleep at the wheel, their car left the road and Kirkpatrick broke his back.  Kirkpatrick dismissed the director of music at St Paul's which resulted in a complaint to the Broadcasting Standards Authority being upheld against TV3's reporting.

In 2001, Kirkpatrick moved to Auckland and headed Auckland University of Technology's Business Innovation Centre, where he stole NZ$660,000 from the university and in October 2011 was jailed for three years and two months. He was released on parole after his first appearance in front of the New Zealand Parole Board in October 2012 after serving a third of his jail term.

References

1958 births
Living people
Deans of Dunedin
New Zealanders convicted of fraud
New Zealand gay men
Prisoners and detainees of New Zealand
New Zealand LGBT rights activists